Mary Stopford, Countess of Courtown, may refer to:

Mary Stopford, Countess of Courtown (died 1810)
Mary Stopford, Countess of Courtown (died 1823)